Albert Arenas Ovejero (born 11 December 1996) is a Spanish motorcycle racer set to compete in the 2023 Moto2 World Championship, riding for Red Bull KTM Ajo. He won the 2020 Moto3 World Championship.

Career

Moto3 World Championship
Arenas debuted in the Moto3 World Championship in the last race of the 2014 season in Valencia, as he was signed by Calvo Team to replace the injured Eric Granado. In 2015 he was the FIM CEV Moto3 Junior World Championship runner-up.

Aspar Team (2016)
In the 2016 Moto3 season he first made three appearances with the Aspar Team, two as a wild card entry and one as the substitute for the injured Jorge Martín,

Peugeot MC Saxoprint (2016)
In 2016, later joined the Peugeot MC Saxoprint team as the permanent replacement for Alexis Masbou.

Aspar Team (2017–2020)
In 2020, He finished the 2020 Moto3 World Championship season as the world champion, taking 174 points with 3 wins and 5 podiums.

Moto2 World Championship

Aspar Team (2021–2022)
Arenas has joined the Aspar Moto2 team from the 2021 season.

Red Bull KTM Ajo (from 2023)
He will competed for the Red Bull KTM Ajo Moto2 team from the 2023 season.

Career statistics

CEV Buckler Moto3 Championship

Races by year
(key) (Races in bold indicate pole position, races in italics indicate fastest lap)

FIM CEV Moto3 Junior World Championship

Races by year
(key) (Races in bold indicate pole position, races in italics indicate fastest lap)

Grand Prix motorcycle racing

By season

By class

Races by year
(key) (Races in bold indicate pole position, races in italics indicate fastest lap)

 Half points awarded as less than two thirds of the race distance (but at least three full laps) was completed.

References

External links

Profile on GPUpdate.net

1996 births
Living people
Spanish motorcycle racers
Motorcycle racers from Catalonia
Moto3 World Championship riders
Sportspeople from Girona
Moto2 World Championship riders
Moto3 World Riders' Champions